Siah Khowleh (also Romanized as Sīāh Khowleh; also known as Kalāteh-ye Sīāh Kholeh) is a village in Jannatabad Rural District, Salehabad County, Razavi Khorasan Province, Iran. At the 2006 census, its population was 390, in 80 families.

References 

Populated places in   Torbat-e Jam County